The 1967–68 Scottish Cup was the 83rd staging of Scotland's most prestigious football knockout competition. The Cup was won by Dunfermline Athletic who defeated Heart of Midlothian in the final.

Preliminary round 1

Replays

Preliminary round 2

Replays

Second Replays

First round

Replays

Second round

Replays

Quarter-finals

Replays

Semi-finals

Replays

Final

See also
1967–68 in Scottish football
1967–68 Scottish League Cup

References
2. https://www.thecelticwiki.com/scottish-cup-1967-68/

Scottish Cup seasons
1967–68 in Scottish football
Scot